This is a list of films produced in Cameroon, from the 1960s to the present day.

2022
Love Trap
The Planters Plantation
Half-Heaven

2021
Hidden Dreams by Nchini Justin

2020

Therapy is directed by Anurin Nwunembom & Musing Derick The movie dramatises a dysfunctional couple that hires the services of an unconventional therapist in an effort to solve their marital troubles. Mr. Lima is almost losing his mind over his wife's psychological pain. The methods of Dr. Benedicta leads the couple to discover truths that threaten the couple more.

The Fisherman's Diary by Enah Johnscott. A 12-year-old girl - Ekah (Faith Fidel) - is inspired by Malala Yousafzai's story and is determined to get an education. In a village of uneducated fishermen, she gets entangled with her father's - Solomon (Kang Quintus) - past experience with girl child education.

2019
Broken directed by Anurin Nwunembom and produced by Syndy Emade

2018

 Le serpent de Bronze by Thierry Ntamack

2017

 A Man For The Weekend directed by Achille Brice and produced by Syndy Emade (2017)
 Breach of Trust Directed by Nkanya Nkwai and produced by Roseline Fonkwa featuring Epule Jeffrey
 "Apple For Two" Directed by Enah Johnscott and produced by Elung Brenda Shey

2007

Volcanic Sprint

2005

 Les Saignantes Directed by Jean Pierre Bekolo (2005)
 Sisters in Law by Florence Ayissi(2005)

2004

 Moolaadé (2004)

2003

 Le silence de la forêt

2000

 Yahan Ameena Bikti Hai

1996

 Clando by Jean-Marie Téno

1995

 Le grand blanc de Lambaréné by Bassek Ba Kobhio (1995)

1985

 Chocolat

1983

 Histoires drôles et drôles de gens by Jean-Pierre Dikongue Pipa (1983)

1980

 Notre fille by Daniel Kamwa (1980), entered into the 12th Moscow International Film Festival

1970s

 Le prix de la liberté (1978)
 Muna Moto (1975)
 Ribo ou le soleil sauvage (1978)

References

External links
 Cameroonian film at the Internet Movie Database

Lists of African films
Lists of films by country of production
 
Films